The 1956 TCU Horned Frogs football team represented Texas Christian University (TCU) in the 1956 NCAA University Division football season. The Horned Frogs finished the season 8–3 overall and 5–1 in the Southwest Conference. The team was coached by Abe Martin in his fourth year as head coach. The Frogs played their home games in Amon G. Carter Stadium, which is located on campus in Fort Worth, Texas. They were invited to the Cotton Bowl Classic where they won against Syracuse by a score of 28–27.

Following the 1955 season, TCU expanded Amon G. Carter stadium with the addition of a two-level press box and upper deck area. The upper deck area introduced a large, block-letter stylization of the TCU logo on the seats, which measured approximately 60' x 120' feet in design. The design is visible to the opposing stands, as well as to planes descending into the DFW International Airport. Upon completion of the expansion, the official seating capacity of the stadium was raised from 37,000 to 46,083.

Schedule

References

TCU
TCU Horned Frogs football seasons
Cotton Bowl Classic champion seasons
TCU Horned Frogs football